Snežnik is a dispersed settlement on the slopes of Mount Snežnik in the Municipality of Ilirska Bistrica in the Inner Carniola region of Slovenia.

Geography
Snežnik includes the hamlets of Mašun to the north, Sviščaki to the west, and Gomanjče to the south on the border with Croatia.

History
Snežnik became an independent settlement in 1989, when territory was split off from the settlements of Ilirska Bistrica and Koritnice to constitute it.

References

External links
Snežnik on Geopedia

Populated places in the Municipality of Ilirska Bistrica